Rebecca Ndolo Muambo (born 16 July 1985) is a Cameroonian  freestyle wrestler. She competed in the women's freestyle 48 kg event at the 2014 Commonwealth Games where she won a bronze medal.

Major results

References

External links

1985 births
Living people
People from Buea
Cameroonian female sport wrestlers
Commonwealth Games bronze medallists for Cameroon
Wrestlers at the 2014 Commonwealth Games
Wrestlers at the 2016 Summer Olympics
Olympic wrestlers of Cameroon
Commonwealth Games medallists in wrestling
African Games silver medalists for Cameroon
African Games medalists in wrestling
Competitors at the 2003 All-Africa Games
Competitors at the 2007 All-Africa Games
Competitors at the 2015 African Games
African Wrestling Championships medalists
20th-century Cameroonian women
21st-century Cameroonian women
Medallists at the 2014 Commonwealth Games